"Hungry" is the third episode of the seventh season of the science fiction television series The X-Files. It premiered on the Fox network in the United States on November 21, 1999. It was written by Vince Gilligan, directed by Kim Manners, and featured a guest appearance by Chad Donella. The episode is a "Monster-of-the-Week" story, unconnected to the series' wider mythology. However, unlike previous Monster-of-the-Week stories, "Hungry" is told from the monster's perspective. "Hungry" earned a Nielsen household rating of 9.6, being watched by 16.17 million people in its initial broadcast. The episode received mixed to positive reviews from critics.

The show centers on FBI special agents Fox Mulder (David Duchovny) and Dana Scully (Gillian Anderson) who work on cases linked to the paranormal, called X-Files. Mulder is a believer in the paranormal, while the skeptical Scully has been assigned to debunk his work. In this episode, a fast-food employee with unusual cravings becomes the focus of an FBI investigation under the direction of Mulder and Scully. The victims appear with no brain and a suction hole in the forehead.

Gilligan wanted to try a "different" approach to The X-Files with "Hungry" by telling the main story through the eyes of the monster. Actor Chad Donella, who portrayed the monster, was chosen because he possessed a "subtle, interesting quality," according to casting director Rick Millikan. Manners was pleased with Donella's performance, calling him a "great little actor." Because both David Duchovny and Gillian Anderson were filming movies, Return to Me and The House of Mirth respectively, the production company decided to film "Hungry" before any of the other episodes, even though it would be aired third, after the conclusion of "The Sixth Extinction" arc.

Plot
In Costa Mesa, California, a young man named Donald Pankow approaches the drive-thru of a Lucky Boy fast food restaurant. Despite the restaurant being closed, Pankow angrily demands service. The sheepish fast food attendant tells the man to drive to the next window, where he is attacked and violently pulled out of his car. Pankow's body is later discovered with the brain removed from the skull. Fox Mulder (David Duchovny) and Dana Scully (Gillian Anderson) are assigned to assist the local police in their investigation.

The only clue found at the scene is a Lucky Boy employee button. Mulder and Scully check all of the employees and discover that one of the clerks, Derwood Spinks (Mark Pellegrino), is missing his button. Scully suspects Spinks after it is discovered he has a criminal record. Mulder, however, believes that the victim's brain was removed by a proboscis, and suspects another employee, Rob Roberts, of committing the murder. Rob, who is actually a mutant human who wears a disguise to hide his true physical body, subsists on brains in order to survive. When Rob's landlady, Sylvia Jassey, is trailed by a private investigator (Steve Kiziak), Rob kills him and eats in order to placate his hunger, which begins to get more and more uncontrollable.

Spinks visits Rob at his home the following day, annoyed at being fired from Lucky Boy for lying about his criminal record. He confronts Rob with evidence of his role in Pankow's murder - a vial of Rob's diet pills with a bloody fingerprint on the lid - and attempts to blackmail him. Later that day, Rob intrudes Spinks' residence to retrieve his pills, but hides in a closet when Spinks returns; noticing that someone is in his home, Spinks arms himself with a baseball bat. As Spinks heads to the closet, Rob takes off his disguise, opens the closet door, and reveals his true self to a stunned Spinks before killing him. Rob later meets with Dr. Mindy Rinehart, a counselor hired by Lucky Boy to consult the employees following Pankow's killing. In session with her, Rob admits that he is battling an "eating disorder." Rinehart sends him to an Overeaters Anonymous meeting, not fully understanding Rob's true nature.

Rob is visited by Mulder and Scully about Spinks' disappearance; Mulder then reveals about Pankow's missing brain and that a "tiny shark's tooth" was discovered by Scully embedded in his skull. At the OA meeting, Rob sees Sylvia but does not respond well to the meeting (by discreetly detailing the taste of a brain as "salty", "juicy", and "buttery" and especially visualizing a pulsing brain when a man turns to Sylvia). Rob and Sylvia bond on the trip home. Unfortunately, his hunger is far too overpowering and he is reluctantly compelled to feed upon her. To cover up her murder, Rob disposes of her body and smashes up his own apartment with Spinks' baseball bat. He tells Mulder and Scully that Spinks showed up and accused him of being the killer. Mulder then asks Rob if he recognizes Kiziak, the private investigator, but Rob says no. Both agents leave to find Sylvia.

Rinehart shows up to find Rob packing his things, intent on leaving town. After a bitter argument, with Rinehart revealing that she knew Rob murdered Pankow, he reveals his true self to Rinehart. However, before Rob prepares to attack her, she shows deep sympathy for him, throwing Rob off guard. At that moment, the agents arrive with guns drawn, having found Sylvia's body. Rinehart tells Rob to be the good person she knows he is capable of being. Instead, Rob charges at Mulder and is shot twice in the chest, committing suicide by cop. As Rob lies dying, Rinehart asks, "Why?" To which he replies, "I can't be something I'm not."

Production

Writing and casting
When Vince Gilligan wrote "Hungry," he wanted to write a "different" episode that was told from the viewpoint of the monster and featured Mulder and Scully as the antagonists. Series creator Chris Carter applauded this idea and called the resultant episode a "really great monster show." Gilligan's intention was for the monster to be relatable and resonate with the audience. He later said, "My intention […] was that at the end, when Mulder and Scully show up and kill the monster, to have the audience out there hoping that they would not show up."

Chad Donella was cast as the lead monster because he possessed a "subtle, interesting quality," according to casting director Rick Millikan. Director Kim Manners latter described Donella as a "great little actor." Duchovny's stunt double, Steve Kiziak played the role of the private detective—also called Steve Kiziak—that Roberts kills and eats. Kiziak later said, "It was a lot of fun to be in front of the camera." Kiziak had first appeared as Duchovny's body double in the third season episode "2Shy," and would later appear as a Mulder lookalike in "Fight Club."

Filming and location
As both David Duchovny and Gillian Anderson were filming the movies Return to Me and The House of Mirth, respectively, when season seven entered into production, the network decided to film "Hungry" before any of the other episodes, despite the fact that it would be aired third, after "The Sixth Extinction" arc. This allowed Duchovny and Anderson to film their scenes and complete their movies with relatively little hassle. Several of the finished scenes show Mulder and Scully together, but many of these scenes were created with stand-ins and doubles because of the stars' busy schedules. Duchovny and Anderson were only available for two combined days of filming for this episode.

When designing the sets for "Hungry", the production team found the Lucky Boy Burger restaurant to be relatively easy to create. Originally, restaurant was supposed to be named Burgerlishious, but the restaurant location that was considered ideal for filming had a "Lucky Boy" sign that could not be removed. Later, the design department faced a challenge in creating Roberts' apartment, because the script did not give a detailed account of what it was to look like.

Broadcast and reception
"Hungry" first aired in the United States on November 21, 1999. This episode earned a Nielsen rating of 9.6, with a 14 share, meaning that roughly 9.6 percent of all television-equipped households, and 14 percent of households watching television, were tuned in to the episode. It was viewed by 16.17 million viewers. The episode aired in the United Kingdom and Ireland on Sky1 on April 2, 2000 and received 0.68 million viewers, making it the seventh most watched episode that week. Fox promoted the episode with the tagline "Taste the terror tonight!"

The episode received mixed to positive reviews from critics. Robert Shearman and Lars Pearson, in their book Wanting to Believe: A Critical Guide to The X-Files, Millennium & The Lone Gunmen, rated the episode five stars out of five, calling the premise "Dexter a decade early." The two concluded that "the sympathy that Donella gives Rob as he shows his true colours is very touching. [...] The final moments [of the episode] are a typically smart touch to this neglected gem of a story." Paul Goebel of TV Squad listed Rob Roberts among his favorite X-Files monsters. Rich Rosell from Digitally Obsessed awarded the episode 3.5 out of 5 stars and wrote that the episode features a "great setup, but the climax leaves the usual open-ended questions." Zack Handlen on The A.V. Club called the episode "perfectly acceptable" and awarded it a "B+". He was pleased with the episode's unique format, calling it a "good gimmick" that made an otherwise "forgettable at best" episode—had it been constructed in the typical fashion of The X-Files—into a memorable one. He was also positive towards the episode's use of humor, noting that it "is very much on target". Handlen, however, felt that the story showed the series' tiredness and did not possess much suspense to keep the watcher completely engaged.

Paula Vitaris from Cinefantastique gave the episode a more mixed review and awarded it two stars out of four. She noted that the episode "suffers from a syndrome that has afflicted a great many X-Files episodes in recent seasons […] the syndrome consists of the audience finding out early on who the guilty party is." Vitaris, however, did note that the episode's "saving grace" was Vince Gilligan's satiric writing tone; she called the scene featuring Roberts hallucinating that the burgers he was frying were actually brains "sick, but hilarious". Other reviews were more negative. Kenneth Silber from Space.com was critical of the episode, noting that, although the change in perspective was unique and interesting, "this bit of originality does not rescue the episode from a familiarity bordering on the mundane. It's not the first time we have seen genetic mutants who have an affinity for human body parts." Tom Kessenich, in his book Examinations, gave the episode a relatively negative review. Despite noting that the episode wasn't a "horrible" entry for The X-Files, Kessenich was unhappy with the characterization of Rob Roberts as well as the fact that the killer was revealed very quickly.

Footnotes

Bibliography

External links 

 

1999 American television episodes
Television episodes set in California
Television episodes written by Vince Gilligan
The X-Files (season 7) episodes